Adoopura Jagir is a  village in Bithiri Chainpur block in Bareilly district, Uttar Pradesh, India.

References

Bareilly district